In the Faroe Islands, there are four Scout and Guiding associations forming the Føroya Skótaráð (Faroese Scout Council). They work under the same basic rules, but they do have their own specialties. 

The council is a member of Fællesrådet for Danmarks Drengespejdere and has observer status with Pigespejdernes Fællesråd Danmark.

Component associations

Føroya Skótasamband
Also known as The Yellow Scouts, the organization was founded in 1926. There are five Scout groups in the country. The groups are not connected to religious organizations, and have both girls and boys as members. The uniform is a khaki shirt. There are just under 300 members.

Skótalið Frelsunarhersins
The Salvation Army Scouts or FH-Scouts were founded in 1939. There is only one small group in the country. The group, connected to the Salvation Army, has boy and girl members. The uniform is a gray shirt. In 1994, there were 24 members throughout the country.

Emblem
The Skótalið Frelsunarhersins logo is based on the historic logos of the Salvation Army Life-Saving Scouts and Life-Saving Guards and is except for the text identical to the logo of the Norwegian Salvation Army Scouts (Frelsesarmeens speidere).   It shows in red a lifebuoy with in the centre the letters FH for Frelsens Hær (The Salvation Army) and on the lifebuoy the motto "To Save and to Serve" written in Faroese language.  The symbols in the loops are: bible for caring for the soul, lamp for caring for others, eye for caring for the mind and gymnastics clubs for  caring for the body.

The last years, the FH scouts have not had activities, due to the lack of leaders.

Føroya KFUK-Skótar
The Faroese YWCA Scouts, the local Girl Scouts, were founded in 1928. There are four groups in the country, in Tórshavn, Klaksvík, Fuglafjørður, and Kollafjørður. They are connected to the Lutheran Church. In most places, there are only female members. The uniform is a darkgreen shirt and a lightgreen scarf with a trefoil. In 2021, there were 230 members.

 Spírur (Sprouts) – ages 6-8.       "Vit hjálpast at, og vit hjálpa øðrum". We help each other, and we help others.
 Tìtlingar (Brownies) - ages 8-10.  "Vit vilja standa saman, vit vilja gera okkara besta". We stand together, we do pur best
 Skótar (Scouts) – ages 10 to 13    "Vit eru til reiðar", We are prepared.
 Ungdómsskótar (Youth Scouts) – ages 14 to 18
 Leiðarar (Leaders) – ages 16 and older

Homepage: kfukskotar.fo

KFUM Skótarnir I Føroyum

The Faroese YMCA Scouts were founded in 1939. There are 7 groups in the country, and the organization is also connected to the Lutheran Church. The uniform is a green shirt and members are both male and female. In 1994, there were 14 groups and 998 members in the country.

Scout Promise, Law and Motto
The four associations use different versions of the Scout Promise and the Scout Law.

The Scout Motto is Ver til reiðar, Be Prepared.

References

External links 
 Official homepage

Youth organizations based in the Faroe Islands
World Association of Girl Guides and Girl Scouts member organizations
World Organization of the Scout Movement member organizations
Overseas branches of Scouting and Guiding associations
Scouting and Guiding in Denmark

Youth organizations established in 1926